Little Red Boots is the third studio album by Lindi Ortega, released in 2011. Music videos were shot for "Little Lie" (June 2011) and "Black Fly" (October 2011).

Reception
The album debuted at #99 on the Canadian Albums Chart.

The album was nominated for Roots & Traditional Album: Solo in the 2012 Juno Awards.

The album was named as a longlisted nominee for the 2012 Polaris Music Prize on June 14, 2012.

Track list
All tracks written by Lindi Ortega unless otherwise noted.

References

2011 albums
Lindi Ortega albums
Last Gang Records albums